Peter Thomas Ward (July 26, 1937 – March 16, 2022) was a Canadian-born professional baseball player who appeared in 973 games over nine seasons in Major League Baseball as a third baseman, outfielder and first baseman for the Baltimore Orioles, Chicago White Sox (–) and New York Yankees. 

Ward was the runner-up for the American League (AL) Rookie of the Year Award (to pitcher and teammate Gary Peters) in 1963, but was named that season's AL Rookie of the Year by The Sporting News.

Early life
Born in Montréal, he was the son of former National Hockey League forward Jimmy Ward, who played 11 seasons for the Montreal Maroons and Montreal Canadiens, and who later became a longtime coach in professional and amateur hockey in Portland, Oregon. Pete Ward attended Portland's Jefferson High School and  played college baseball at Lewis & Clark College.

Playing career
Ward signed with the Orioles in 1958 as a shortstop, but soon moved to the outfield; although he would be known in the major leagues as a third baseman, the big-league Orioles possessed future Baseball Hall of Famer Brooks Robinson, only a month older than Ward, at the position. Ward batted over .300 at three levels of minor league baseball and won the batting title in the Class B Three-I League in 1960 with a .345 mark. After he was selected to the International League All-Star team in 1962 as an outfielder, Ward received a September trial with Baltimore; he hit .143 with two doubles in 21 at bats.

On January 14, 1963, he was included in one of the off-season's biggest transactions when the Orioles traded him, future Hall of Fame pitcher Hoyt Wilhelm, shortstop Ron Hansen and outfielder Dave Nicholson to the White Sox for shortstop and future Hall of Famer Luis Aparicio and veteran outfielder Al Smith. The White Sox installed Ward as their regular third-baseman, and he responded with a stellar rookie campaign: 177 hits (second in the league), 34 doubles (again second in the AL), 22 home runs, and a .295 batting average (fifth in the league). Chicago won 94 games and finished second to the Yankees. In 1964, Ward avoided the "sophomore jinx" by hitting .282 with 23 home runs and a career-best 94 runs batted in, as the White Sox battled the Yankees and Orioles to the wire before finishing second by a single game.

He was traded to the Yankees in December 1969 for pitcher Mickey Scott and played a single season for the  Yankees as a pinch hitter and back-up first baseman to Danny Cater, a former White Sox teammate. For his nine-year MLB career, Ward amassed 776 hits, including 136 doubles, 17 triples and 98 home runs; he batted .254 with 427 career runs batted in.

He related that during his tenure with the Sox, his team engaged in sign stealing that involved a scout on a chair next to the flagpole at center field with binoculars that would signal a pitch based on if he sat on the chair, stood up, or leaned on a pole, although Ward stated that it would sometimes mess up a hitter's swing.

Manager and coach
Ward remained with the Yankees as a minor-league manager (1972–1977), then coached for one season for Bobby Cox with the Atlanta Braves, before returning to the minors, where he eventually managed his hometown Portland Beavers. He was inducted into the Oregon Sports Hall of Fame, the Canadian Baseball Hall of Fame, and the Chicagoland Sports Hall of Fame.

Personal life
Ward died on March 16, 2022, at the age of 84.

References

External links

1937 births
2022 deaths
Anglophone Quebec people
Ardmore Rosebuds players
Atlanta Braves coaches
Baltimore Orioles players
Baseball coaches from Oregon
Baseball people from Quebec
Baseball players from Portland, Oregon
Canadian Baseball Hall of Fame inductees
Canadian emigrants to the United States
Canadian expatriate baseball players in the United States
Chicago White Sox players
Fort Lauderdale Yankees managers
Fox Cities Foxes players
Jefferson High School (Portland, Oregon) alumni
Lewis & Clark College alumni
Little Rock Travelers players
Major League Baseball first base coaches
Major League Baseball left fielders
Major League Baseball players from Canada
Major League Baseball third basemen
New York Yankees players
Portland Beavers managers
Rochester Red Wings players
Baseball players from Montreal
Sportspeople from Lake Oswego, Oregon
Sportspeople from Portland, Oregon
Stockton Ports players
Syracuse Chiefs managers
Vancouver Mounties players
Victoria Rosebuds players